David Aiken may refer to:

David Aiken (baritone) (1917–2011), American opera singer
D. Wyatt Aiken (1828–1887),  United States congressman from South Carolina